The Tijuana River Estuary is an intertidal coastal wetland at the mouth of the Tijuana River in San Diego County, California, in the United States bordering Tijuana, Baja California, Mexico. It is the location of the Tijuana River National Estuarine Research Reserve, Tijuana Slough National Wildlife Refuge, Border Field State Park, and Tijuana River Valley Regional Park. The estuary is a shallow water habitat. Often termed an intermittent estuary since its volume is subject to the discharge controlled by the seasons of the year, the volume of the estuary fluctuates and at times there is dry land, or flooded areas. It was designated a National Natural Landmark in 1973.

Ecology
The estuary is one of the few remaining salt marshes on the South Coast. Its location positions it under the path of the Pacific Flyway, where it serves as a stopover point. It is the largest remaining natural coastal area between Santa Barbara, California and San Quintín, Baja California. Three times the size of Central Park, the estuary covers about 2,500 acres. Many species of migratory and native species rely on the estuary as an essential breeding, feeding, and nesting habitat. The estuary lies within the southernmost part of San Diego County within the city limits of the South Bay city of Imperial Beach.

Prior to 1994, foot traffic by illegal immigration was a major source of top soil erosion. After 1994, off-road vehicle usage for policing has become a major cause of soil loss. Beginning in 2010, a re-vegetation effort along the Border Infrastructure System has occurred.

References

Further reading

 

Estuaries of California
Wetlands of California
Lagoons of San Diego County, California
Nature reserves in California
Protected areas of San Diego County, California
South Bay (San Diego County)
National Natural Landmarks in California
Landforms of San Diego County, California